E35 may refer to:

Roads
 European route E35
 Guthrie Corridor Expressway, route E35 in Malaysia
 Nishi-Kyūshū Expressway, route E35 in Japan

Vehicles
 HMS E35, a British E class submarine built in 1916
 VinFast VF e35, a 2022–present Vietnamese compact electric SUV